The Wayne County Courthouse, at 510 Pearl St. in Wayne, Nebraska, is a Richardsonian Romanesque-style historic courthouse that was built in 1899. 
It is a  building located in the center of a  square amidst, somewhat unexpectedly, a residential neighborhood.  It was listed on the National Register of Historic Places in 1979.

Its cornerstone indicates that it was designed by Minneapolis architects Orff & Guilbert, but it seems to have been wholly designed by Fremont D. Orff (1856–1914) alone, and it was built by Omaha contractors Rowles & Moore.

References

External links 

More photos of the Wayne County Courthouse at Wikimedia Commons

Courthouses on the National Register of Historic Places in Nebraska
Romanesque Revival architecture in Nebraska
Government buildings completed in 1899
County courthouses in Nebraska
1899 establishments in Nebraska
National Register of Historic Places in Wayne County, Nebraska